Curtis Berry (born June 16, 1959) is a retired American professional basketball player.

As a freshman, Berry moved to the University of Missouri campus at Columbia and averaged 6.8 points in 1978, as a sophomore collegian, he led the varsity in rebounding and was described by experts as a "bull", at the end of his collegiate career, Berry averaged 11.9 points in 112 games, his consistent performance at Missouri convinced the Kansas City Kings to make him their third round pick in the 1981 NBA draft.

Berry wore jersey number 31 at the Kings' training camp and was not able to break into the Kings' roster which was loaded with tested forwards like Cliff Robinson, Reggie King, and Leon Douglas, from the Kings' camp, Berry went to join the Lancaster Lightning in the Continental league.

Berry is currently head boys' basketball coach at Mount Vernon Presbyterian School in Atlanta. In 2002, Berry married Dr. Jacqueline Walters, an OB-GYN; he also has a daughter, Kursten, from a previous marriage. Berry's marriage to Walters has been chronicled on the Bravo reality series Married to Medicine, of which both have been a part since the first episode in 2013.

References

External links
 The Draft Review
 The Southeast Missourian
 1981 NBA Draft Information

1959 births
Living people
American expatriate basketball people in France
American expatriate basketball people in Switzerland
American expatriate basketball people in the Philippines
Basketball players from Alabama
American men's basketball players
High school basketball coaches in Georgia (U.S. state)
Kansas City Kings draft picks
Missouri Tigers men's basketball players
Sportspeople from Selma, Alabama
Philippine Basketball Association imports
Power forwards (basketball)
Basketball coaches from Alabama
United States Basketball League coaches
Tanduay Rhum Masters players